Sumatinatha was the fifth Jain Tirthankara of the present age (Avasarpini). Sumatinatha was born to a Kshatriya King Megha (Megharatha) and Queen Mangalavati (Sumangalavati) at Ayodhya in the Ikshvaku dynasty. His Janma Kalyanak (birthday) was the eighth day of the Vaisakha Sudi month of the Jain calendar.

Tradition 
Sumatinatha was the fifth Jain Tirthankara of the present age (Avasarpini). Sumatinatha was born to Kshatriya King Megha (Meghaprabha) and Queen Mangala (Sumangala) at Ayodhya in the Ikshvaku dynasty. His birth date was the eighth day of the Vaisakha Sudi month of the Jain calendar.

He attained Kevala Jnana under sala or priyangu tree. He became a siddha, a liberated soul which has destroyed all of its karma. Lord Sumithanatha is associated with Heron (Krauncha) emblem, Priyangu tree, Tumburu (Purushadatta) Yaksha and Mahakala Yakshi.

In his previous incarnation, Lord Sumatinatha was an Indra in the Jayanta Vimana.

Adoration 

Svayambhustotra by Acharya Samantabhadra is the adoration of twenty-four tirthankaras. Its five slokas (aphorisms) are dedicated to Sumatinātha. Last of which is:

Main temples
 Bhandasar Jain Temple, Bikaner
 Talajaji

See also

God in Jainism
Arihant (Jainism)
Jainism and non-creationism
Ikshvaku dynasty
24 Tirthankaras of present time cycle

Notes

References
 
 
 
 
 
 

Tirthankaras
Solar dynasty
People from Uttar Pradesh
Ancient Indian people